Barbara Eligmann (born 6 November 1963 in Ludwigshafen) is a German television presenter.

Life 
Eligmann works for German broadcaster RTL Television. She is married and has three children.

Filmography 

 Explosiv – Das Magazin
 clever! – Die Show, die Wissen schafft (together with Wigald Boning)

External links 

SPIEGEL-interview, 26 June 2000 (german)

References 

German television presenters
German women television presenters
1963 births
Living people
RTL Group people